The Exxecution (sometimes stylized as The eXXecution) is a collaborative studio album by Marco Polo and Ruste Juxx. It was released on Duck Down Music on March 23, 2010. It features guest appearances from DJ Revolution, Rock, Freddie Foxxx, Black Moon, and Sean Price. It peaked at number 42 on the Billboard Heatseekers Albums chart, as well as number 67 on the Top R&B/Hip-Hop Albums chart.

Critical reception

At Metacritic, which assigns a weighted average score out of 100 to reviews from mainstream critics, the album received an average score of 85, based on 4 reviews, indicating "universal acclaim".

Matt Rinaldi of AllMusic stated that Marco Polo provides "loop-heavy tracks that recall the 1990s East Coast heyday" and Ruste Juxx spits "aggressive battle-ready verses rife with verbal threats and street-corner boasts." Chris Yuscavage of XXL praised "the undeniable chemistry demonstrated by Polo and Juxx." Chris Faraone of The Phoenix wrote, "this duo have executed one of the greatest roughneck opuses this side of last century."

Track listing

Charts

References

External links
 

2010 albums
Marco Polo (producer) albums
Duck Down Music albums
Albums produced by Marco Polo